Bukit Merah, also known as Redhill, is a planning area and new town situated in the southernmost part of the Central Region of Singapore. the planning area borders Tanglin to the north, Queenstown to the west and the Downtown Core, Outram and Singapore River planning areas of the Central Area to the east.

Bukit Merah shares a maritime boundary with the Southern Islands planning area located beyond its southernmost point. It is the most populated planning area in the Central Region, and the 12th most populated planning area in the country overall, being home to more than 150,000 residents.

Etymology 
Bukit Merah translates to “red hill” in Malay, and is a reference to the red-coloured lateritic soil found on the hill. According to the Sejarah Melayu, Singapore used to be plagued by swordfish attacking the people living in the coastal regions. A young boy named Hang Nadim proposed an ingenious solution, to build a wall of banana stems along the coast at the present location of Tanjong Pagar.

When the swordfish attacked, their snouts were stuck in the stems. With the swordfish problem solved, Hang Nadim earned great respect from the people, but also jealousy from the rulers. The fourth King of Singapura, Paduka Seri Maharaja, finally ordered his execution, and it was said that his blood-soaked the soil of the hill where he was killed, giving rise to the red-coloured hill.

The hill was eventually trimmed to its current state in 1973, when it made way for Redhill Close and what would eventually become the now defunct Henderson Secondary School. During its existence, a Chinese cemetery was situated on the reverse side of this hill, which is today, the location of Tiong Bahru.

History 
Keppel Harbour dates back to the 14th century when an ancient Chinese traveller, Wang Dayuan named the harbour as "Long-Ya-Men" or "Dragon Teeth Gate" after two rock outcrops located near Labrador Park, which resembled dragon's teeth. The two rock outcrops were subsequently blown up by the Straits Settlements Surveyor, John Thomson, in August 1848 to widen the entrance a new harbour.

Mount Faber was once known as Telok Blangah Hill. Its name was changed to Mount Faber after Captain Edward Faber cut the road up to the top in 1845 to set up a signal station. The Singapore General Hospital site dates back to 1882. Labrador Nature Park was used as a defence outpost in the 19th century until World War II.

With the earliest records of Bukit Merah's existence in the Malay Annals, the town had a huge role to play in the early maritime trade of the Kingdom of Singapura.

The town's fertile red soil was employed to great effect, when it was a district rich in gambier cultivation during British colonial rule.

Even before the industrialisation of Jurong, Bukit Merah already had a small head start in the emerging heavy industry market in Singapore. With the first brickwork factories and mills emerging in the precincts of Henderson Hill and Redhill as early as the 1930s.

The town is also home to the first housing estate in the country, Tiong Bahru, which was developed by the Singapore Improvement Trust in the backdrop of a rapidly growing population in post-war Singapore. The estate later became the basis of what would eventually become the first new town in the Republic, Queenstown.

Geography 

According to the various master plans laid out by the Urban Redevelopment Authority, Bukit Merah is bounded by Alexandra Canal and the Singapore River to the north and HarbourFront and Keppel Bay to the south, Kim Seng Road, Outram Road and Cantonment Road to the east and Alexandra Road to the west. There are several subzones within the planning area, namely Alexandra, Bukit Ho Swee, Bukit Merah Central, Depot Road, Everton Park, HarbourFront, Henderson, Redhill, Singapore General Hospital, Telok Blangah and Tiong Bahru.

Subzones

Transportation

Mass Rapid Transit 
The namesake Redhill MRT station was the first MRT station to open in area, in 1988. Today, there are currently 7 MRT stations that serve the planning area across 4 lines, the East West line, Circle line, North East line and the Thomson-East Coast line. HarbourFront MRT station is an interchange station between the North East line and the Circle line, which is also the current terminus for both lines. Outram Park MRT station was initially a double-line interchange station between the East West and North East lines but became a triple-line interchange station after the commencement of the third stage of the Thomson–East Coast line in 2022. The 7 stations are:

  Havelock
 Outram Park
 Tiong Bahru
 Redhill
 Labrador Park
 Telok Blangah
 HarbourFront

Future stations that are currently under construction include:

 Keppel
 Cantonment

The future stations, Keppel and Cantonment will be located within the new town as part of Stage 6 of the Circle line that will be completed by 2026.

Bus 

There are two bus interchanges and one bus terminal in the new town. The Bukit Merah Bus Interchange, which serves Bukit Merah, is located at Bukit Merah Town Centre. Service Number 132 links the Interchange to Redhill MRT station while bus services 5, 16, and 851 links the interchange to Tiong Bahru MRT station. There are two feeder services originating from the interchange which serves the Telok Blangah estate. The HarbourFront Bus Interchange is located at the southern part of Bukit Merah, serving nearby amenities such as the HarbourFront Centre and VivoCity, the largest shopping mall in Singapore. The Kampong Bahru Bus Terminal is located along Spooner Road, near the vicinity of the Singapore General Hospital.

Education

Primary schools 

Alexandra Primary School
Blangah Rise Primary School
Cantonment Primary School
CHIJ Kellock
Gan Eng Seng Primary School
Radin Mas Primary School
Zhangde Primary School

Secondary schools 

Bukit Merah Secondary School
CHIJ St. Theresa's Convent
Crescent Girls' School
Gan Eng Seng School

Tertiary Institutions 

 Duke-NUS Graduate Medical School

Other schools 

 APSN Tanglin School
ISS International School (Preston Campus)
Shelton College International

Amenities

Places of Worship

Buddhist Temples 
 Wat Ananda Metyarama Thai Buddhist Temple
 Kwan Yam Theng Buddhist Temple
 Buddhist Fellowship West Centre, in Yeo's building

Chinese Temples 
 Ban Siew San Kuan Imm Temple (1880)
 Giok Hong Tian Temple (1887)
 Hock Teck Tong Temple (1932)
 Kai San Temple (1904)
 Kim Lan Beo Temple (1830, relocate in 1984)
 Leng San Teng Temple (1879)
 Koon Seng Ting Temple (1880)
 Lei Yin Temple (1957)
 Qi Tian Gong Temple (1920)
 Qi Tian Tan Temple (1949)
 Tai Yeong Kon Temple (1947)
 Tang Gah Beo Temple
 Telok Blangah Ting Kong Beo Temple (1923)

Chinese Clan Temples 
 Lim See Tai Chong Soo Kiu Leong Tong Temple
 San Jiang Gong Ci Temple

Chinese Combined Temples 
 Chia Leng Kong Heng Kang Tian Temple
 Chin Leng Keng (Leng San Teng, Chin Lin Keng & Ban Sian Beo)
 Temple of Liang Hong Sze Kong Hock Keng Heap Hoe Keng

Churches 
 Grace Assembly of God 1
 Church of God Singapore
 Church of St. Teresa
 Danish Seamen's Church
 Grace Methodist Church
 Pasir Panjang Tamil Methodist Church
 St. Matthew's Church
 Telok Ayer Chinese Methodist Church

Hindu Temples 
 Sri Ruthra Kaliamman Temple

Mosques 
 Masjid Al-Amin Mosque
 Masjid Jamiyah Ar-Rabitah Mosque
 Masjid Kampong Delta Mosque
 Masjid Temenggong Daeng Ibrahim

Sikh Temples 
 Gurdwara Sahib Silat Road

Shopping Centres 
 Alexandra Central
 Alexandra Retail Centre
 Concorde Shopping Centre
 Depot Heights Shopping Centre
 HarbourFront Centre
 Tiong Bahru Plaza
 VivoCity

Parks 

 Alexandra Canal Linear Park
 Alexandra Hill East Neighbourhood Park
 Bukit Purmei Hillock Park
 Henderson Park
 Labrador Nature Reserve
 Mount Faber Park
 Rumah Tinggi Eco Park
 Telok Blangah Hill Park
 Tiong Bahru Park

Community Centres/Clubs 
 Bukit Merah Community Centre
 Henderson Community Club
 Kim Seng Community Centre
 Leng Kee Community Centre
 Radin Mas Community Club
 Telok Blangah Community Club
 Tiong Bahru Community Centre

Sports facilities 
 Delta Sports Complex
 SAFRA Mount Faber
 Sports Lifestyle Centre

Politics 
Bukit Merah belongs to six political divisions in four constituencies. A large portion of Bukit Merah is under Tanjong Pagar GRC with some areas under Jalan Besar GRC, Radin Mas SMC and West Coast GRC, served by the People's Action Party. As of the 2020 General election, the Members of Parliament for Tanjong Pagar GRC are Indranee Rajah for Tanjong Pagar-Tiong Bahru division, Joan Pereira for Henderson-Dawson division and Eric Chua for Queenstown division. Melvin Yong is the current Member of Parliament for Radin Mas SMC, Rachel Ong for Telok Blangah division of West Coast GRC and Josephine Teo for Kreta Ayer-Kim Seng division of Jalan Besar GRC. The planning area is overseen by three town councils, namely Tanjong Pagar Town Council (TPTC), West Coast Town Council (WCTC) and Jalan Besar Town Council (JBTC).

Bukit Merah is covered by two Community Development Councils (CDC), Central Singapore District and South West District. Denise Phua is the current mayor for Central CDC and Low Yen Ling is the current mayor for South West CDC.

See also 

Kim Seng Road
Jalan Bukit Merah
Alexandra

References

Sources 
Victor R Savage, Brenda S A Yeoh (2003), Toponymics – A Study of Singapore Street Names, Eastern Universities Press, 
https://lostnfiledsg.wordpress.com/2012/08/09/bukit-merah-town-centre/
http://eresources.nlb.gov.sg/infopedia/articles/SIP_779_2005-01-26.html

External links 
Legend of Bukit Merah at the Singapore Museum website

 
Central Region, Singapore
Hills of Singapore
Places in Singapore